Air travel is a form of travel in vehicles such as airplanes, jet aircraft, helicopters, hot air balloons, blimps, gliders, hang gliders, parachutes, or anything else that can sustain flight. Use of air travel has greatly increased in recent decades – worldwide it doubled between the mid-1980s and the year 2000. Modern air travel is much safer than road travel.

Domestic and international flights
Air travel are separated into two general classifications: national/domestic and international flights. Flights from one point to another within the same country are domestic flights. Flights from a point in one country to a point within a different country are international flights. Travelers can use domestic or international flights in either private or public travel.

Commercial air travel
Travel class on an airplane is usually split into a two, three or four class model service. U.S. domestic flights usually have two classes: economy class and a domestic first class partitioned into cabins. International flights may have up to four classes: economy class; premium economy; business class or club class; and first class.

Most air travel starts and ends at a commercial airport. The typical procedure is check-in; border control; airport security baggage and passenger check before entering the gate; boarding; flying; and pick-up of luggage and – limited to international flights – another border control at the host country's border.

For longer journeys, air travel may consist of several flights with a layover in between. The number of layovers often depends on the number of hub airports the journey is routed through.

Airlines rely either on the point-to-point model or the spoke-and-hub model to operate flights in between airports. The point-to-point model, often used by low-cost carriers such as Southwest, relies on scheduling flights directly between destination airports. The spoke-and-hub model, used by carriers such as American and Delta, relies on scheduling flights to and from hub airports. The hub-and-spoke model allows airlines to connect more destinations and provide more frequent routes, while the point-to-point system allows airlines to avoid layovers and have more cost effective operations.

Environmental effects

Modern aircraft consume less fuel per person and mile travelled than cars when fully booked. 
This argument in favor of air travel is counterweighted by two facts:
 The distances travelled are often significantly larger and will not replace car travel but instead add to it, and
 Not every flight is booked out.
Instead, the scheduled flights are predominant, resulting in a far worse fuel efficiency.
According to the ATAG, flights produced  of the greenhouse gas  in 2015 globally, as compared to an estimated total of  anthropogenic . Carbon offset is often proposed as solution to mitigate the  emissions of flying. There are many NGOs that offer to compensate  emissions by advancing clean renewable energy, reducing energy consumption and capturing already released carbon in trees or other plants. However, carbon offsetting is a very controversial topic as it only tries to mitigate what has already been emitted.

Safety 

Modern air travel is significantly safer than road travel. In 2008 in the United States, there were 1.27 fatalities per 100 million road vehicle miles, compared to no fatalities and almost zero accidents per million flying miles. There were more than five million driving accidents, compared to 20 accidents in flying. Travellers may perceive planes to be more dangerous as they do not allow individual control and because plane crashes are more catastrophic events (the availability bias).

Health effects

Deep vein thrombosis (DVT) is the third-most common vascular disease, next to stroke and heart attack. It is estimated that DVT affects one in 5,000 travellers on long flights. Risk increases with exposure to more flights within a short time frame and with increasing duration of flights.

Most healthy travelers will not notice any effects. However, for travelers with cardiopulmonary diseases (especially those who normally require supplemental oxygen), cerebrovascular disease, anemia, or sickle cell disease, conditions in an aircraft can exacerbate underlying medical conditions. Aircraft cabin air is typically dry, usually 10%–20% humidity, which can cause dryness of the mucous membranes of the eyes and airways.

See also

Aviation accidents and incidents
Aviation safety
Commercial aviation
Environmental impact of aviation
Frequent-flyer program
History of aviation
Hypermobility
List of passenger airlines
Punctuality
Travel document

References

External links

 http://openflights.org/ a tool that lets you map your flights around the world
 https://aerogon.aero/ air trafficking management  

Types of travel
Civil aviation